Metaingolfiella is a monotypic genus of crustaceans belonging to the monotypic family Metaingolfiellidae. The only species is Metaingolfiella mirabilis.

References

Ingolfiellidea